Shamin Mannan is an Indian actress. She received appreciation and recognition for playing a NRI girl Bhoomi in Sanskaar - Dharohar Apno Ki

Season 1 on Colors TV.

Early and personal life
Shamin was born in Dibrugarh Assam. She has a younger sister, Tamanna Mannan who is also a TV actress, known for her role of Naina in TV show Nazar on star plus

Career
Shamin appeared in many TV commercials - Dabur Gulabari Rose Water, Bagh bakri tea, Dish TV, Sony Ericson, Polycrol antacid & McDonalds. She was most appreciated for Colors TV's Sanskaar - Dharohar Apno Ki as Bhoomi.

Web

Television

References

External links

 

Living people
Indian television actresses
Actresses in Assamese cinema
Date of birth missing (living people)
Year of birth missing (living people)